Sparto is a village and a community in Aetolia-Acarnania, Greece. The community consists of the villages Sparto, Pigadaki and Tria Alonia.

Populated places in Aetolia-Acarnania